The 4th Central Bureau of the Chinese Communist Party (Chinese: 中国共产党第四届中央局) was elected by the 4th Central Executive Committee of the Chinese Communist Party in Shanghai in January 1925.  It was preceded by the 3rd Central Bureau of the Chinese Communist Party.

Members
Chen Duxiu, General Secretary and Head of Central Organizational Department
Peng Shuzhi, Head of Central Propaganda Department
Zhang Guotao, Head of Central Department for Workers and Farmers
Cai Hesen, member of Central Propaganda Department
Qu Qiubai, member of Central Propaganda Department

External links
 The 4th Leaders of the 4th CCP National Congress

Politburo of the Chinese Communist Party
1925 in China